Rafael de Faria Cortez (born October 25, 1976) is a Brazilian journalist, actor and comedian.

Education and career 
Cortez graduated in journalism from PUC-SP and between 2008 and 2012 was a reporter of Custe o Que Custar.

On July 15, 2011, the show was the release of their independent CD called "Elegia da Alma" ("Elegy of the Soul", in English).

In 2013 Cortez was hired by the Rede Record to present the show Got Talent Brasil, a local version of Got Talent.

Television

Films

References

External links

 
 

1976 births
Living people
People from São Paulo
Brazilian people of Spanish descent
Brazilian male comedians
Brazilian male television actors
Brazilian male film actors
Brazilian male stage actors
Brazilian journalists
20th-century Brazilian people